Houssin is a surname of French origin.

List of people with the surname 

 Édouard Houssin (1847–1919), French sculptor
 Jacques Houssin (1902–1979), French film director and screenwriter
 Joël Houssin (born 1953), French author 
 Timothée Houssin (born 1988), French politician

See also 

 Hussein

Surnames
Surnames of French origin